Kingston upon Thames London Borough Council is elected every four years.

Political control

Leadership
The leaders of the council since 1972 have been:

Council elections
 1964 Kingston upon Thames London Borough Council election
 1968 Kingston upon Thames London Borough Council election
 1971 Kingston upon Thames London Borough Council election
 1974 Kingston upon Thames London Borough Council election
 1978 Kingston upon Thames London Borough Council election (boundary changes reduced the number of seats by ten)
 1982 Kingston upon Thames London Borough Council election
 1986 Kingston upon Thames London Borough Council election
 1990 Kingston upon Thames London Borough Council election
 1994 Kingston upon Thames London Borough Council election
 1998 Kingston upon Thames London Borough Council election (boundary changes took place but the number of seats remained the same)
 2002 Kingston upon Thames London Borough Council election (boundary changes reduced the number of seats by two) 
 2006 Kingston upon Thames London Borough Council election
 2010 Kingston upon Thames London Borough Council election
 2014 Kingston upon Thames London Borough Council election
 2018 Kingston upon Thames London Borough Council election
 2022 Kingston upon Thames London Borough Council election

Borough result maps

By-election results

1964-1968
There were no by-elections.

1968-1971

1971-1974

1974-1978

Joseph Wrigglesworth replaced R. St. J. Stephens who resigned due to being a Council employee.

1978-1982

1982-1986

1986-1990

1990-1994

The by-election was called following the resignation of Cllr. Christopher A. Nicholson.

1994-1998

The by-election was called following the resignation of Cllr. Adrian J. Clare. 

The by-election was called following the resignation of Cllr. Jonathan E. M. Stratford.

The by-election was called following the resignation of Cllr. Mary Watts.

1998-2002

The by-election was called following the resignation of Cllr. Ian Manders.

2002-2006

The by-election was called following the resignation of Cllr. Roger M. Hayes.

The by-election was called following the resignation of Cllr. Anthony B. Blurton.

2006-2010
There were no by-elections.

2010-2014

The by-election was called following the resignation of Cllr. Umesh Parekh.

The by-election was called following the resignation of Cllrs. Robert-John Tasker and James C. White.

The by-election was called following the resignation of Cllr. David M. Edwards.

The by-election was called following the resignation of Cllr. Marc L. Woodall.

The by-election was called following the death of Cllr. Ms. Frances M. Moseley.

The by-election was called following the resignation of Cllr. Derek R. Osbourne.

2014-2018
There was a by-elections held on 16 July 2015 for the Grove ward, with Jon Tolley holding the seat for the Lib Dems.

2022-2026

References

External links
Kingston upon Thames Council